Den Sorte Skole (English: "The Black School") is a Copenhagen-based DJ, producer and composer collective, known for creating music using diverse samples. They were formed in 2004 by Simon Dokkedal, Martin Højland, and Martin Fernando Jakobsen, who has been on leave since 2011. The group's work has been described as creating "sample symphonies".

History 

Den Sorte Skole started out as a hip-hop and reggae DJ crew and soon became the Danish frontrunners practicing the concept of mash-up DJing. By making surprising blends of legends like Neil Young with Dj Premier and Janis Joplin with Dj Format live on turntables, they gathered a large following in Denmark. This resulted in their first release – the mixtape, Lektion #1 from 2006.
 
Three years later, Lektion #1 was followed by Lektion #2 from 2008 – a more complex mix of vinyl samples gathered from a much more genre-diverse group of music. Everything from Anatolian progressive rock, British horror movie soundtracks, and forgotten Danish folk tunes came together with dark hip-hop beats and explosive thunderclaps from early dub-step and drum'n'bass. Though still a mixtape, Lektion #2 became the best-reviewed release in Denmark in 2008 and Den Sorte Skole went on several sold-out tours.
 
In January 2010 Roskilde Festival challenged the Den Sorte Skole to create an anniversary concert celebrating the festivals 40-year history from 1971 to 2010. They undertook the task with great awe and humility and spent months digging through Roskilde's vast musical catalogue. The result was a massive 2-hour celebration with 30.000 people that was hailed in the leading Danish daily Politiken as "a demonstration of the historical superiority of the Roskilde Festival containing both legends and the diversity of shifts in musical expression through the years past".
 
With Lektion III, Den Sorte Skole has left the realm of mash-ups and mixtapes completely and released a full-scale sampled-based album. Lektion III also marks another important change for Den Sorte Skole. Through the years, they became known as a band that tore the roof off and left concert arenas in flames. Now they have set out on a completely different path. Lektion III is a contemplative and very demanding listen that sends the listener on an introspective journey into – and through – their own mind and the different moods of life. The mission is to encourage people to really listen and lose themselves in the music. And those that are open and patient will be rewarded with an album that slowly grows on them and reveals new details even after many a listen.
 
For their Lektion III tour, Den Sorte Skole hooked up with the acclaimed Danish visual artist group Dark Matters, who have put together a mind-expanding visual journey complementing the music. Dark Matters had been fascinated with minimal graphics and patterns for a long time, but used Lektion III as a project to base a visual concept on a narrative instead. From the top of a mountain to the deep bottom of the sea, Lektion III live is an audio-visual sample tale from every corner of the world and beyond. Check the following link and learn more: http://www.darkmatters.dk/Den-Sorte-Skole

Lektion III 
Thousands of samples lifted off more than 250 old vinyl records from 51 countries on six continents. Two years of dedicated work followed by a failed attempt to clear the samples with IFPI Denmark.

This is the very short story behind Copenhagen duo Den Sorte Skole's new magnum opus, Lektion III. A 1,5 hour long musical odyssey that blends everything from Moroccan traditional songs, Indian hymns and field recordings of Cameroonian Pygmies to forgotten Yugoslav psych, French avant-garde noise and early German electro into a dark and giddy trip through musical history and beyond.

There are no genres and no boundaries – this is musical storytelling across time and space. Indian tabla- players jam with German synth pioneers, Iraqi oud-legends with French percussionists and Indonesian singers with voodoo preachers from Bahamas! Like a ghost-band brought to life from the crates of forgotten music playing favorite tunes from a parallel world.

"It's been a long time since the idea of an artist sampling another's work could be considered shocking or transgressive", Canadian RVA Magazine wrote in their review. Den Sorte Skole's work could. They have sampled the whole world and managed to avoid the clichés of forced cultural crossings. They have made a sample-based album without focusing it around beats, which distinguishes it from most sample- based music. To put it simple – Den Sorte Skole made an album from samples, but you can't hear that! Isolated elements from old records from around the globe are merged like they were destined to meet. Their music simply subsumes its component elements into a cohesive whole with the greatest of ease.

Due to their unsuccessfully attempt to clear the samples with IFPI Denmark, Lektion III can't be sold on iTunes, Boomkat etc. but is now available as a free – and 'illegal' - download from their website. With the album comes a 40-page booklet going into great depth with the artists they have sampled on Lektion III, the process of making it and the legal and musical context it was made in. Download the booklet here.

Lektion #3 was released on April 22, 2013.

Press reviews of Lektion III:

Weekendavisen
"Den Sorte Skole's new label might not stand up in court, but it is original and coherent sound art. On Lektion III the restlessness of the Internet is replaced with a depth in musical quality. The composition is brought to life in a long, fascinating and dizzying feel. Melodies, sounds and rhythms bring distant atmospheres, moods, memories and thoughts to your inner play list in this suggestive, enticing and labyrinth total composition. A horn of plenty that stretches over nearly 90 minutes."
 
Information
"A spectacular bastard (...) where Den Sorte Skole rolls out an impressive map of samples. A global ghost-orchestra, where voices and sounds of the past and from completely different places and cultures come together to jam. Isolated elements from old records are fascinatingly merged like they were destined to meet each other and keep the collective sub-consciousness of musical culture together. "
 
Politiken
"Lektion III is a magnum opus for crate-diggers around the world, showing the kaleidoscopic depth of the Internet as a musical treasury. Den Sorte Skole have a tight grip on their compositions and a constant ear for the insisting rhythm, the beauty of a complaining melody and not least the feeling for putting together those special sounds that only old quirky recordings can have. They have raised a monument of memory and outlook in a time of musical upheaval."

Press reviews, live acts 2013:

Politiken, 5/6 stars at ROSKILDE FESTIVAL 2013, Arena Stage
"The Danish kings of sampling delivered from the first minute and seduced the crowd with an impressive concert."
 
Gaffa, 5/6 stars at ROSKILDE FESTIVAL 2013, Arena Stage
"From cut-up to composition, from remix to art. The immediate strength of the concert was its banging releases while its long-term quality was the omnipresence of sonic poetry." 
 
Smagsdommerne DR2 at The Royal Danish Playhouse 2013
"It was amazing, simply amazing. I was so impressed that I had a hard time keeping it inside me (...) I'm proud that this project comes out of small Denmark." (Tine Fischer, Director CPH:DOX)"

Lektion #2 
Lektion #2 was released in May 2008. This 65 minute mixtape was created from more than 400 vinyl samples, ranging from the Spanish International Brigades, British soft porn soundtracks, and Turkish women's liberation anthems to rap legends and doom boom from the deep eighties. "Lektion #2″ was the best reviewed Danish release in 2008.

Press reviews of Lektion #2:

Politiken
"DSS brings together musical treasures across time, tempo and genre in amazing style" (link)
 
DR (Danish Broadcasting Company)
"The best Turntablelism since Dj Shadows Endtroducing (1996)" 
 
Nyhedsavisen
"This is indeed one of the most ambitious projects in Danish beat history" 
 
Urban
"An awesome ambitious venture mastered with perfection down to every last detail" 
 
Berlingske Tidende
"The Trio truly shows their superiority working their way through this huge pile of vinyl" 
 
Hiphopanmeldelser.Blogspot.com
"This Tour-de-force of musical fragmentation is a tribute to turntableism as well as music in general"

Lektion #1 
In February 2006, Den Sorte Skole released their first full-length mixtape. A 74 LP mix recorded on four turntables and three mixers with an overall idea to bring together artists stretching from Neil Young and Janis Joplin over Company Flow to Afrika Bambaataa. "Lektion # 1" was awarded "Best Danish Hip Hop album of 2006" by the leading Hip Hop magazine in Denmark.

References

External links
  - Den Sorte Skole's official page
  - Den Sorte Skole's Facebook page
  - Den Sorte Skole on SoundCloud

Danish musical groups